The National Parliament is the unicameral national legislature in East Timor. It was created in 2001 as the Constituent Assembly while the country was still administered by the United Nations, but renamed itself to the National Parliament with the attaining of national independence on 20 May 2002.

Structure 
National Parliament has 65 members, elected every five years through party-list proportional representation voting. The three main components of concerning parliament in East Timor are the National Parliament, the prime minister, and the president.

President 
The president is elected in a separate election from National Parliament, and their role is the head of state. They are able to reject certain legislation, but their role is limited by the Constitution. The current president, as of 20 May 2022, is José Ramos-Horta.

Prime Minister 
The president appoints the prime minister, but it is expected that the president will select the leader chosen by the largest party/coalition. Essentially, if no one party is able to form a majority in its own right, then all the members of parliament subsequently elect the head of government. The prime minister carries out the function of the head of government. The current prime minister, as of 22 June 2018, is Taur Matan Ruak.

Elections
Elections are held every five years using a party-list proportional representation voting system to elect 65 members to the National Assembly. Voting is voluntary for all East Timorese citizens over the age of 17. There have been five elections for the parliament in East Timor: 2001, 2007, 2012, 2017, and 2018.

Current members
The 5th National Parliament of East Timor currently consists of 65 members elected in the 2018 election. 34 members are from Alliance for Change and Progress (CNRT–PLP–KHUNTO), 23 are from Fretilin, 5 are from the Democratic Party (PD), and 3 are from Democratic Development Forum (PUDD–UDT–FM–PDN). Each of these MPs will serve a 5-year term, which began in June 2018.

List of presidents of the National Parliament

Composition of the National Parliament since 2001

See also
 Politics of East Timor
 List of legislatures by country

References

External links

 Parliament of East Timor
 News reports about the East Timor National Parliament
 About the Parliament

National Parliament
National Parliament
East Timor
East Timor
East Timor
2001 establishments in East Timor